Renuka Ramnath is an Indian private equity fund manager, and the founder and CEO of Multiples Asset Management Ltd. She is also an independent director of the apparel manufacturer Arvind Ltd., chairperson of the board at Tata Communications, and chairperson of the Indian Private Equity and Venture Capital Association.

Career
Ramnath founded Multiples Asset Management in 2009, with a focus on mid size companies and investments between $15 million and $50 million. The firm's partners include the Canada Pension Plan Investment Board which invested $100 million in 2010.

Prior to founding Multiple Asset Management Ltd., Ramnath was the MD and CEO of ICICI Ventures, the venture capital arm of the ICICI Group, through the period that saw the firm become one of the largest private equity funds in India. She is credited with helping grow the fund from a $100 million proprietary fund to a $2 billion PE fund with third-party capital. In this time she is also credited with raising, managing and divesting the $250 million India Advantage fund, generating a more than triple return on capital. She has also served within the ICICI Group across investment banking, e-commerce, and private equity.

Some of Ramnath's venture investments include investments in Air Deccan, Tata Infomedia, VA TechWabag.

Ramnath and ICICI Ventures were also the targets of a legal action from Azim Premji's investment company Premji Invest when one of the portfolio companies Subhiksha, a leading discount retailer, ran out of cash and closed over 1,600 stores nationwide. The notice alleged that Ramnath and ICICI Ventures had not revealed the extent of Subhiksha's problems before the sale to Premji Invests.

Ramnath has been featured in listings such as the Top 25 Most Powerful Women in Business (Business Today, India); India's most Powerful CEO's (Economic Times), the Top 25 Non Bank Women in Finance (US Banker's global list), Asia's Women in the Mix: The Year's Top 50 for Achievement in Business (Forbes), and the Top 25 women in Asian asset management (Asian Investor).

References

External links
 Official Profile at Arvind Ltd website

Indian women bankers
Living people
Private equity and venture capital investors
Indian business executives
Indian venture capitalists
1962 births